Bluff was an American magazine specializing in the game of poker. Separate editions were also published for Europe, Latin America, South Africa and Australasia.  The American edition began as a bimonthly in October 2004 and went monthly in August 2005.   Production of the magazine was ceased in February 2015.

In December 2006, Bluff Magazine purchased thepokerdb.com, an online tournament database. Churchill Downs purchased Bluff Media in February 2012.

The magazine annually named the "Poker Power 20," the 20 most important people in the poker industry.

Bluff Europe magazine
Bluff Europe magazine is a monthly European sister title to Bluff Magazine first published in March 2006.  Printed in the United Kingdom and focusing more on the European poker circuit, regular contributors include professional players including Neil Channing, Liv Boeree, Tom Sambrook, Phil Laak, Antonio Esfandiari, and Mike Caro.

Bluff Magazine South Africa
Bluff Magazine South Africa is an alternate monthly Southern African sister title to Bluff Magazine America.  Published by Maverick Publishing Corp., Bluff Magazine SA focuses mainly on the poker industry in Southern Africa. Ryan Dreyer, top South African poker player and winner of the 2008 Sun City Millions poker tournament, is the editor.

Notes

External links
 
 Europe edition site
 South African edition site

2004 establishments in Georgia (U.S. state)
2015 disestablishments in Georgia (U.S. state)
Churchill Downs Incorporated
Defunct magazines published in the United States
Magazines established in 2004
Magazines disestablished in 2015
Magazines published in Atlanta
Monthly magazines published in the United States
Poker publications